TCG may refer to:

Businesses and organisations
 Taipei City Government, Taiwan
 TCG (company), U.S. investment advisory firm
 Teleport Communications Group, defunct U.S. telephone company
 Theatre Communications Group, New York non-profit
 Thomas Cook Group, defunct travel agency and airline
 Tongan Crip Gang, street gang in North America and Australasia
 Trusted Computing Group, commercial consortium on technological protection measures
 Tunisian Combat Group, Islamist insurgents' network

Other uses
 Geocentric Coordinate Time
 Test call generator, in telecommunications
 TCG (album), 2007 album from The Cheetah Girls
 Trading card game, collectible form of game
 Türkiye Cumhuriyeti Gemisi, ship prefix for Ship of the Turkish Republic
 The genetic code for the amino acid Serine, according to the DNA codon table
 IATA code for Tacheng Airport, China
 Tiny Code Generator, interpreter/translator engine of QEMU